Shane Glines is an illustrator, animator, and character designer.  He is the founder of CartoonRetro and currently serves as its president.

Animation
Glines worked as a layout and cleanup artist for Spümcø, before becoming a character designer at Warner Bros. for DC Comics based series such as Batman: The Animated Series and Batman Beyond. He also did character design work on Cartoon Network's Samurai Jack and was the lead character designer on Harley Quinn.

Illustration

Glines has illustrated several covers for the comic Gotham Girls.

External links
 Shane Glines Tumblr
 
 An Audio Interview with Shane Glines by SiDEBAR
 A video interview with Shane Glines

American animators
American animated film directors
Historians of animation
Pin-up artists
Living people
Year of birth missing (living people)